Trachelipus riparianus is a species of woodlouse in the genus Trachelipus belonging to the family Trachelipodidae that is endemic to Italy.

References

Trachelipodidae
Endemic fauna of Italy
Woodlice of Europe
Crustaceans described in 1936